The 2016 Football League Cup Final was a football match played at Wembley Stadium, London, on 28 February 2016 to determine the winner of the 2015–16 Football League Cup, the 56th edition of the Football League Cup, a competition for the 92 teams in the Premier League and Football League. It was contested by Liverpool and Manchester City, with Manchester City winning 3–1 in a penalty shoot-out after the match had finished 1–1 after extra time. They would have qualified for the Third Qualifying Round of the 2016–17 UEFA Europa League, but they ultimately qualified for the 2016–17 UEFA Champions League instead by virtue of their league position.

Background
Liverpool were participating in a record 12th League Cup Final, having previously won a record eight, most recently in 2012 against Cardiff City. Their last loss was in 2005 to Chelsea.

Manchester City made their fifth appearance in the final, having won three previous times, the last of which as recently as 2014 against Sunderland.

Route to the final

Liverpool

Liverpool, as a Premier League team involved in the 2015–16 UEFA Europa League, started the competition in the third round. In this they were drawn against Football League Two team Carlisle United, at their home ground, Anfield. After extra time the score was 1–1 but Liverpool advanced after a 3–2 penalty shoot out win. In the fourth round they were drawn at home again, this time against fellow Premier League team AFC Bournemouth; they won the game 1–0 after Nathaniel Clyne's debut goal for Liverpool.

In the quarter finals, they were drawn away to fellow Premier League team Southampton. At St. Mary's Stadium, Liverpool won 6–1 with a hat-trick from Divock Origi, two goals from Daniel Sturridge and one from Jordon Ibe. In the two-legged semi-final, Liverpool were drawn against Stoke City. At the Britannia Stadium, Liverpool won the first leg 1–0 due to a goal from Ibe. However, they lost the second leg 1–0 at Anfield, their first home loss in a League Cup semi-final, necessitating a penalty shoot out which Liverpool won 6–5; goalkeeper Simon Mignolet saved from Peter Crouch and Marc Muniesa with Joe Allen scoring the winner.

Manchester City

Manchester City, as a Premier League team involved in the 2015–16 UEFA Champions League, started in the third round, in which they were drawn away against Sunderland. At the Stadium of Light, Manchester City won 4–1 with goals from Sergio Agüero, Kevin De Bruyne, Raheem Sterling and an own goal from Vito Mannone. In the next round they were drawn at home against Crystal Palace. At the City of Manchester Stadium, Manchester City won 5–1 with goals from Wilfried Bony, De Bruyne, Kelechi Iheanacho, Yaya Touré and Manu García.

In the quarter-finals, they were drawn against Hull City at home, where they won 4–1 with goals from Bony, Iheanacho and two from De Bruyne. In the semi-finals, they were drawn against Everton where despite losing 2–1 at Goodison Park, Manchester City won 3–1 at the City of Manchester Stadium thus reaching the final 4–3 on aggregate and also preventing a Merseyside derby final.

Match

Summary
In the 49th minute Fernandinho opened the scoring for Man City with a low shot from a tight angle on the right of the box that went into the far corner under Liverpool goalkeeper Simon Mignolet. In the 60th minute Raheem Sterling had a chance to make it 2-0 but he passed the ball wide of the near post from six yards out. In the 83rd minute, Daniel Sturridge drilled the ball in from the right beyond the far post, the ball came to Adam Lallana whose shot hit the face of the near post with the ball coming back to Philippe Coutinho, who scored with a low right foot shot from 12 yards out. There were no more goals in the 90 minutes or in the 30 minutes of extra-time with the match going to a penalty shoot-out. Emre Can scored the first penalty of the shoot-out for Liverpool before Fernandinho missed the first spot-kick for Man City, hitting the post. Lucas Leiva then missed the next kick for Liverpool, with Willy Caballero diving to his left to save. Jesús Navas then scored with his kick before Philippe Coutinho missed with the next kick for Liverpool, Caballero saving again to his left. Sergio Agüero then scored before Caballero dived to his right to save from Adam Lallana. Yaya Touré scored with a low shot to the left to win the game for Man City 3-1 on penalties.

Details

Post-match 
In winning, Manchester City qualified for the Third Qualifying Round of the 2016–17 UEFA Europa League; however, they subsequently qualified for the 2016–17 UEFA Champions League via their league position. The vacant UEFA Europa League berth was instead allocated to the club ranked highest in the 2015–16 Premier League that had not already qualified for Europe, which was seventh-placed West Ham United.

See also
 2016 FA Cup Final

References

2016
League Cup Final
Cup Final
2016 sports events in London
Events at Wembley Stadium
League Cup Final 2016
League Cup Final 2016
February 2016 sports events in the United Kingdom
Football League Cup Final 2016